The fluvial shiner (Notropis edwardraneyi) is a species of ray-finned fish in the genus Notropis. It is endemic to the United States, where it is found in the Mobile Bay drainage in Alabama and Mississippi, mostly in main channels of Tombigbee, Black Warrior, Cahaba, and Alabama rivers, almost exclusively below the Fall Line.

References 

 

Notropis
Fish described in 1968